West Bromwich Albion Football Club is an English football club based in West Bromwich, West Midlands. The club was founded in 1878 and has competed in the English football league system from its conception in 1888. Since their first qualification to major European cup competition in 1966, they have participated in the Inter-Cities Fairs Cup, the European Cup Winners' Cup, the UEFA Cup, the Texaco Cup, the Anglo-Italian Cup, the Anglo-Scottish Cup, as well as winning the Tennent Caledonian Cup. However, they have not competed in European cup competition since 1996, and not partaken in UEFA-sanctioned European cup competition since 1981.

History

1966–67 Inter-Cities Fairs Cup
The Baggies first season in European competition was in the Inter-Cities Fairs Cup in the 1966–67 tournament, after finishing in sixth position in the First Division the season before. Their first opponents were DOS Utrecht. After a 1–1 draw in the Netherlands, Albion ran riot with a 5–2 win at home. Next, they faced Bologna, who beat them 6–1 on aggregate to end their campaign.

1968–69 European Cup Winners' Cup
Albion won the FA Cup in 1967–68, by beating Everton in the Final, which secured their maiden European Cup Winners' Cup campaign. Their first round opponents were Club Brugge. In the first leg, Brugge won 3–1, however the Baggies won 2–0 at home – enough to see the English club through thanks to the away goals rule. Against Dinamo București in the second round, the first leg finished 1–1, but WBA won the second leg 4–0. In the quarter-final against Dunfermline Athletic, the first leg finished scoreless. The second leg was a 1–0 win for Dunfermline, the winning goal scored by Pat Gardner.

1970 Anglo-Italian Cup
WBA entered the inaugural Anglo-Italian Cup in 1970 and for the group stage, were placed in Group 2, with Lanerossi, Middlesbrough and Roma. Each club would face the clubs from the other country in their group home and away, and the English and Italian club with the best record in the tournament out of the three groups would play each other in the Final. WBA finished fourth in the English table.

1970–71 Texaco Cup
The Baggies first Texaco Cup campaign came in the 1970–71 season, however it would be a very brief interlude, as Morton eliminated them in the first round. In the first leg, Morton came from behind to win 2–1. In the second leg at the Hawthorns, Morton won 1–0, and WBA were out.

1971 Anglo-Italian Cup
In the group stage of the 1971 Anglo-Italian Cup, WBA were placed in Group 2, with Cagliari, Crystal Palace and Inter Milan. Having drawn the first game 1–1 against Inter, Albion lost the remaining three games, leaving them rooted to the bottom of the table. Due to lack of interest the tournament ceased after the 1973 edition.

1972–73 Texaco Cup
The Throstles fared slightly better in their second try at the Texaco Cup. Faced with Sheffield United in the first round, the first leg finished 1–1. A 1–0 win was enough to safely progress to the second round where Newcastle United awaited. A 2–1 win in the first leg looked promising, but the Magpies won the second leg 3–1, ending the West Midland club's hopes.

1974–75 Texaco Cup
The Texaco Cup format was changed in the 1974–75 season. Group stages were introduced for the English clubs. Each team would play the others in the group once, with only the team finishing top of the group progressing. The four Scottish clubs would join in at the quarter-final stage. WBA were in Group 1, with Birmingham City, Norwich City and Peterborough United. After a no-score draw at home to Birmingham, Albion beat Norwich 5–1. However, a 2–1 loss at Peterborough meant that Albion finished second of their group, and left the competition at the group stage.

1975–76 Anglo-Scottish Cup
After Texaco dropped their sponsorship of the tournament, the Anglo-Scottish Cup was created in the 1975–76 season, using largely the same format as the Texaco Cup the previous year, but with the introduction of a Scottish Qualifier round to select four from eight teams for the quarter-final stage. Albion were in Group 2 of the English Qualifiers, with Hull City, Leicester City and Mansfield Town. Albion first drew 1–1 with Mansfield, before beating Hull 2–1. However, losing by the same scoreline to Leicester meant that WBA did not progress, again finishing second in the group, this time behind Mansfield.

1976–77 Anglo-Scottish Cup
In the 1976–77 season of the Anglo-Scottish Cup Albion were placed in Group 2, with Bristol City, and Nottingham clubs Forest and Notts County. Losses to Bristol City and Forest were followed by a 3–1 win over County. WBA finished third, the team to progress from Group 2 was Forest, and the Reds went on to win the tournament.

1977 Tennent Caledonian Cup
On the weekend on 6 and 7 August 1977, Rangers held the 1977 edition of an invitational tournament at their Ibrox home stadium called the Tennent Caledonian Cup. As well as Rangers, the teams to take part were St Mirren, Southampton and WBA. In the semi-final against St Mirren, the Baggies won 4–3. In the final, Albion won 2–0, with both goals coming from Laurie Cunningham.

1978–79 UEFA Cup
A finish of sixth in the 1977–78 season saw the Baggies qualify for the UEFA Cup for the first time in 1978–79. The other English clubs to compete were Arsenal, Everton and Manchester City. In the first round, WBA faced Turkish side Galatasaray. Two 3–1 wins in each leg put Albion through to face Braga in the second round. Wins both home and away saw the Baggies progress to the third round. Spanish club Valencia CF were the opposition, and a 1–1 draw at their Mestalla Stadium followed by a 2–0 home win saw them safely through. In the quarter-finals Red Star Belgrade won the first leg by one goal to nil, and WBA could only muster a 1–1 draw, ending their tournament.

1979–80 UEFA Cup
A finish of third in the 1978–79 season earned the Baggies a second consecutive UEFA Cup campaign. English clubs Everton, Ipswich Town and Leeds United also qualified for the 1979–80 tournament. WBA were faced with FC Carl Zeiss Jena, and the East Germans eliminated Albion with victories at home and away.

1981–82 UEFA Cup
A finish of fourth in the 1980–81 season earned the Throstles a third UEFA Cup campaign in four seasons. English clubs Arsenal, Ipswich and Southampton also qualified for the 1981–82 tournament. Just as in the preceding season, Albion's European adventure would last just one round – this time it was Swiss side Grasshoppers who put Albion out by beating them home and away.

1982 Ciutat de Barcelona Trophy
On 17 and 18 August 1982, RCD Espanyol held the 1982 edition of an invitational tournament at their Estadi Olímpic Lluís Companys home stadium called the Ciutat de Barcelona Trophy. As well as the home team, the teams to take part were CA Osasuna, FC Spartak Moscow and WBA. Albion faced the home team in the semifinal, and lost 3–2; Cyrille Regis and Martin Jol were the goalscorers for the Baggies. In the third place play-off match Cyrille Regis opened the scoring however Osasuna won 2–1. The team from the Soviet Union were the eventual victors, beating Espanyol 3–1.

1993–94 Anglo-Italian Cup
Albion's first entry to the Anglo-Italian Cup since the revival of the competition in 1992 came in the 1993–94 tournament. In the preliminary round, they were placed in Group 4 with Leicester City and Peterborough United. A scoreless draw with Leicester and a 3–1 win over Peterborough saw WBA progress to the group stage. In the group stage, the Baggies were in Group 2, with English teams Portsmouth, Stoke City, and Southend United, and Italian clubs Cosenza, Fiorentina, Padova and Pescara. Albion finished bottom of the table, not picking up a single point in the process.

1995–96 Anglo-Italian Cup
In the 1995–96 Anglo-Italian Cup, Albion were put into Group 2, with English clubs Ipswich Town, Stoke City, Southend United and Italian teams Brescia, Foggia, Reggiana and Salernitana. With two wins, one draw and one loss, Albion progressed to the English semi-final, where Birmingham City awaited. After a 2–2 draw, Albion triumphed on penalties to go through to the English final. Port Vale were the opposition, and the first leg finished goalless. The second leg finished 3–1 to Vale, and they went through. The tournament itself was scrapped after this tournament because the two leagues could not agree on dates for fixtures, and due to increasing violence at matches.

Overall record

Notes

References

General

Specific

Europe
West Bromwich Albion